Life Like may refer to:

 Life-Like, a manufacturer of model railroad products
 Life Like (Joan of Arc album), 2011
 Life Like (The Rosebuds album), 2008
 "Lifelike", a 2018 song by Antarctigo Vespucci on the album Love in the Time of E-Mail
 Life Like (film), a 2019 sci-fi movie

See also
 Like Life, a Japanese visual novel